Rahel Radiansyah (born 22 May 1991) is an Indonesian professional footballer who plays as a winger for Liga 1 club Persik Kediri.

Club career

SSB BULOG Jatim Surabaya
Mulai berlatih sejak usia dini di SSB BULOG Jatim Surabaya dan ikut mengikuti pertandingan lokal dan Nasional mulai Kelompok Umur U-12.

Persegres Gresik
He was signed for Persegres Gresik to play in Liga 1 in the 2017 season. Radiansyah made his league debut on 7 May 2017 in a match against Bhayangkara at the Patriot Candrabaga Stadium, Bakasi.

Martapura
In 2018, Radiansyah signed a contract with Indonesian Liga 2 club Martapura. He made 27 league appearances and scored 6 goals for Martapura.

Sriwijaya
He was signed for Sriwijaya to play in Liga 2 in the 2020 season. This season was suspended on 27 March 2020 due to the COVID-19 pandemic. The season was abandoned and was declared void on 20 January 2021.

Persela Lamongan
In 2022, Radiansyah signed a contract with Indonesian Liga 1 club Persela Lamongan. He made his league debut on 6 January 2022 in a match against Persipura Jayapura at the Kapten I Wayan Dipta Stadium, Gianyar.

Persik Kediri
Radiansyah was signed for Persik Kediri to play in Liga 1 in the 2022–23 season. He made his league debut on 25 July 2022 in a match against Persita Tangerang at the Indomilk Arena, Tangerang.

Honours

Club
Persisam Putra Samarinda U-21
 Indonesia Super League U-21 runner-up: 2012

References

External links
 Rahel Radiansyah at Soccerway
 Rahel Radiansyah at Liga Indonesia

1991 births
Living people
People from Palangka Raya
Indonesian footballers
Association football midfielders
Liga 1 (Indonesia) players
Liga 2 (Indonesia) players
Persisam Putra Samarinda players
Persiba Balikpapan players
Persegres Gresik players
Gresik United players
Dewa United F.C. players
Persela Lamongan players
Persik Kediri players
Indonesia youth international footballers